Jennifer Saret (born 12 December 1974) is a Filipino former tennis player.

Tennis career
Saret featured in a total of 24 ties for the Philippines Fed Cup team and was a regular medalist for her country at the Southeast Asian Games, debuting in the regional competition as a 14 year old in 1989. Locally, she made her mark by winning four successive PCA Open championships from 1989 to 1992. She was a junior doubles semi-finalist at the 1991 Wimbledon Championships.

From 1992 to 1996 she took up a sports scholarship to attend Brigham Young University (BYU) in the United States, where she played varsity tennis. She was the Western Athletic Conference Player of the Year in 1995.

Her Fed Cup career was put on hold while she was at BYU but she returned to the national team in 1997 and made her last appearance in 2001. She retired from Fed Cup tennis with a Philippines record 26 wins, 15 of which came in singles.

ITF finals

Doubles: 1 (0–1)

References

External links
 
 
 

1974 births
Living people
Filipino female tennis players
BYU Cougars women's tennis players
Sportspeople from Metro Manila
Southeast Asian Games silver medalists for the Philippines
Southeast Asian Games bronze medalists for the Philippines
Southeast Asian Games medalists in tennis
Competitors at the 1989 Southeast Asian Games
Competitors at the 1991 Southeast Asian Games
Competitors at the 1993 Southeast Asian Games
Competitors at the 1995 Southeast Asian Games
Competitors at the 1997 Southeast Asian Games
Competitors at the 2001 Southeast Asian Games